Student Association Hezarfen is a student association with a Turkish background in Delft, the Netherlands. The association itself is multicultural and aimed at students with both a bicultural background as students who are interested in other cultures.

History and objectives 
The association was founded in 2013 by Turkish-Dutch students at the Delft University of Technology. The main objective of the association is to bring the target audience together into a social and academic atmosphere. Other goals of the association are: 
 Ensure coordination between students, academics and researchers at both national and international levels 
 To support students in their academic career
 Liaise and consult individuals and organizations in the fields of education, culture and science 
 To contribute to the social position of the target audience
 Promoting the integration and support of the personal growth

The name Hezarfen
"Hezar 'is a word of Persian origin meaning 'thousand' and 'fen' is a word of Arabic origin, where it is a generic term for knowledge in science, such as physics, chemistry and mathematics. 
The word 'Hezarfen (thousand-sciences) receives the meaning 'to be in possession of a thousand kinds of sciences', or a versatile scholar (also known as" polymath "). This is an appropriate title for a student at the Technical University of Delft, in the sense that they are known for their wide knowledge of different kinds of sciences. 
Hezarfens from history include Lagâri Hasan Çelebi, Ismail ibn Hammad al-Jawhari, Abū Rayḥān al-Bīrūnī and Leonardo da Vinci. The Turkish-Islamic scholar Ahmed Çelebi, the first person who has flown with handmade wings, is commonly known with the nickname 'Hezarfen'.

External links
 Official website

Student societies in the Netherlands